Caroline Garcia and Aurélie Védy were the defending champions, but both players chose not to participate.

Vesna Dolonc and Irina Khromacheva won the title, defeating Naomi Broady and Julia Glushko in the final, 6–2, 6–0.

Seeds

Draw

References 
 Draw

Open Saint-Gaudens Midi-Pyrenees - Doubles